Northwood Hills is a neighborhood in north Dallas, Texas, U.S.. The neighborhood is bounded by Belt Line Road on the north, Coit Road on the east, Alpha Rd east of Hillcrest on the south and White Rock Creek on the west. The Northwood Hills shopping center was the original shopping district for the area; it has since been renamed Spring Valley Crossing and is anchored by Sunnyland Outdoor Living.

Education 
The neighborhood is served by the Richardson Independent School District.

External links 
 Northwood Hills Homeowners Association